= Booby hatch =

Booby hatch may refer to:

- a raised framework or hoodlike covering over a small hatchway on a ship
- a pejorative slang term for a psychiatric hospital
